HMS Prince of Orange was a 70-gun third rate ship of the line of the Royal Navy, built by Richard Stacey to the 1719 Establishment at Deptford Dockyard, and launched on 5 September 1734.

In 1748, Prince of Orange was cut down to a 60-gun ship, a role in which it remained until being converted into a sheer hulk in 1772.
The Prince of Orange was part of the British Fleet at the capture of Louisbourg in 1758.

David Ramsay, fur trader, revolutionary War soldier, and Indian-killer was a crew member of Prince of Orange at both the Battle of Louisbourg in 1758 and the battle of Quebec in 1759. She brought Richard Short, the military artist to Quebec in 1759, where he drew pictures of the fleet, unfortunately not naming any vessel in particular. He served as purser on her from 1759 to 1761, within that period the ship was in Halifax, Nova Scotia and Quebec City.

After nearly 40 years service as a hulk, she was finally sold out of the navy in 1810.

Gallery of the fleet at anchor in Halifax, 1759, from sketches by Richard Short

References

Lavery, Brian (2003) The Ship of the Line - Volume 1: The development of the battlefleet 1650-1850. Conway Maritime Press. .

Ships of the line of the Royal Navy
1730s ships